Zier Tebbenhoff (born 1 February 1972 in The Hague) is a Dutch retired footballer.

Career

In 1995, Tebbenhoff was released by ADO Den Haag due to financial problems and was replaced by amateur players. After not being able to find a team to join for 6 months, he said "Everyone around me asks me why I don't play at a club. I don't understand myself either. I know what I can do, but I'm on my own. I have to keep myself sharp through running training and competitions at an amateur club from The Hague. I am used to the highest, then this is very disappointing".

References

External links
 

Living people
1972 births
Dutch footballers
Netherlands youth international footballers
Association football forwards
Feyenoord players
SVV Scheveningen players
FC Dordrecht players
ADO Den Haag players
Eredivisie players
Footballers from The Hague